The discography of Beck, an American rock musician, singer-songwriter, record producer and multi-instrumentalist, consists of 14 studio albums, one compilation album, one remix album, four extended plays (EPs) and 52 singles. With a pop art collage of musical styles, oblique and ironic lyrics, and postmodern arrangements incorporating samples, drum machines, live instrumentation and sound effects, Beck has been hailed by critics and the public throughout his musical career as being amongst the most creative and idiosyncratic musicians of 1990s and 2000s alternative rock.

Beck released his debut album Golden Feelings through independent record label Sonic Enemy in 1993. Later that year, his first singles, "Loser" and "MTV Makes Me Want to Smoke Crack", helped to quickly gain the attention of major record labels. In early 1994, after issuing Stereopathetic Soulmanure on Los Angeles-based independent Flipside Records, Beck made his major label debut with DGC Records, releasing Mellow Gold on March 1, 1994. The album's lead single "Loser" (previously available only as a standalone single on Bong Load Custom Records) reached No. 10 on the Billboard Hot 100 and helped introduce Beck to a mainstream audience. That year, he released a third album, One Foot in the Grave, on indie label K Records, which included appearances by members of Beat Happening, The Presidents of the United States of America and Built to Spill.

Beck released his breakthrough album Odelay on June 18, 1996, which included the successful singles "Where It's At" and "The New Pollution". In addition to critical acclaim, Odelay would go on to see double platinum certification in both the US and Canada. His next two albums, Mutations (1998) and Midnite Vultures (1999) maintained the eclectic sound Beck had become known for and saw favorable reviews with continued chart success. In 2002, Sea Change was released to considerable praise from both fans and critics, becoming Beck's first US Top 10 album, supported by a tour that featured The Flaming Lips as his backing band. Beck issued Guero on March 29, 2005, which would become his most successfully charting album to date, reaching No. 2 on the US Billboard 200. The album's first single "E-Pro" topped the Billboard Alternative Songs chart, a feat not achieved by any Beck song since "Loser", over a decade earlier. Two additional US Top 10 albums followed, including The Information (2006) and Modern Guilt (2008), the latter of which gave Beck his first ever Top 10 placing on the UK Albums Chart. His next album, Morning Phase (2014), won him the 2015 Grammy Award for Album of the Year.

Albums

Studio albums

Compilation albums

Remix albums

Demos

Extended plays

Singles

1990s

2000s

2010s and 2020s

Other charted songs

Collaborations
The following releases include contributions from Beck as a producer, songwriter and/or performer.

Remix contributions
The following releases feature songs that have been remixed by Beck.

Record Club

In 2009, Beck founded Record Club, an informal meeting of various musicians with the goal of recording an album in one day. To date, albums covered include:
The Velvet Underground & Nico (originally performed by The Velvet Underground)
Songs of Leonard Cohen (originally performed by Leonard Cohen)
Oar (originally performed by Skip Spence)
Kick (originally performed by INXS)
Yanni Live at the Acropolis (originally performed by Yanni)

Soundtracks
The following is a list of Beck songs that have appeared on film and television soundtracks.

Compilation appearances
The following is a list of non-album tracks by Beck that have appeared on compilations, including tributes and samplers.

Studio

Live, remix, and demo versions

Videography

Video albums and TV broadcasts

Music videos

Notes

References

External links
 Official website 
 Beck at AllMusic
 
 

Discography
Discographies of American artists
Alternative rock discographies